Supernatural is the eighth studio album and ninth album overall by American soul and R&B singer Ben E. King. Released in 1975, it marked King's transition to the main Atlantic Records label after time on subsidiary labels. The single "Supernatural Thing" brought him a return to chart success, reaching No. 1 on the Billboard Hot Soul Singles and peaking at No. 5 on the Billboard Hot 100. The title track and other tracks on the album featured King singing in a higher key as second tenor, rather than his usual baritone.

Track listing
"Supernatural Thing Part 1" (Patrick Grant, Gwen Guthrie) [3:54]
"Supernatural Thing Part 2" (Grant, Guthrie) [3:14]
"Your Lovin' Ain't Good Enough" (Grant, Guthrie) [5:00]
"Drop My Heart Off"  (Sam Dees, Frederick Knight) [4:17]
"Extra Extra" (Dees) [3:48]
"Do It In the Name of Love" (Grant, Guthrie) [4:20]
"Happiness Is Where You Find It" (Dees, Bettye Crutcher, Knight) [3:35]
"Do You Wanna Do a Thing" (Jesse Boyce, Richard Griffith, Sanchez Harley) [4:24]
"Imagination" (Ben E. King, Ben E. King, Jr.) [3:38]
"What Do You Want Me To Do" (Lou Courtney) [3:17]

Personnel
Ben E. King - vocals
Carlos Alomar, Jeff Mironov, Jerry Friedman - guitar
Bob Babbitt, Jerry Jemmott - bass guitar
Derek Smith, Ricky Williams, Bert De Coteaux - keyboards
Jimmy Young - drums
Carlos Martin - congas
George Devens, Jack Jennings, Phil Kraus, Ted Sommers - percussion
Brenda White, Gwen Guthrie, Lani Groves, Yvonne Guthrie - background vocals
Bob Clearmountain, Ron St. Germain, Tony "No. 1" Bongiovi - engineer

References

Ben E. King albums
1975 albums
Atlantic Records albums